Spirit is the sixth studio album by singer-songwriter Amos Lee. It was released August 16, 2016 on the John Varvatos imprint of Republic Records, Lee's first album on a label other than Blue Note Records. It is also the first album which Lee self-produced. Like all previous albums, Lee penned all thirteen songs.

The album debuted on the Billboard Top Rock Albums chart at No. 3, selling  12,000 copies in its first week.

Track listing
All songs written by Amos Lee
"New Love" – 3:45
"Running Out of Time" – 3:19
"Spirit" – 4:50
"Lost Child" – 3:54
"Highways and Clouds" – 3:29
"Lightly" – 3:00
"One Lonely Light" – 3:35
"Wait Up for Me" – 3:45
"Till You Come Back Through" – 3:02
"Hurt Me" – 3:17
"Vaporize" – 3:51
"Walls" – 4:38
"With You" – 3:27

Personnel
Amos Lee – vocals, acoustic and electric guitar, banjo, percussion, background vocals
Jaron Olevsky – keyboards [piano, organ, glockenspiel, synthesizer] (all), bass (3, 8, 10), accordion (8), background vocals (5)
Zach Djanikian – electric guitar (2, 6, 7, 9, 12), bass (5), saxophone (5), mandolin (7, 8), synthesizer (11), background vocals (5, 12)
Mark Colenburg – drums, percussion (1, 2, 4, 6, 9, 11, 12)
Adam Blackstone – bass (1, 2, 4, 6, 9, 11, 12)
Ian Fitchuk – drums, percussion (3, 4, 5, 7), background vocals (5)
Fred Berman – drums (8, 10)
Doug Pettibone – electric guitar (2, 3, 10), pedal steel (10, 11)
Luther Dickinson – electric guitar, background vocals (5)
Andy Keenan – dobro (3), lap steel (6)
Jeff Coffin – saxophone (1, 2, 4)
Rashawn Ross – trumpet (1, 2, 4)
Rob Moose – violin, viola (9, 10, 11, 12, 13)
Anthony LaMarchina – cello (10, 13)
Vanessa McGowan – contrabass (10), bowed bass (13)
Annie Clements – background vocals (1, 2, 6, 7, 8, 12)
Kristen Rogers – background vocals (2, 6, 7, 12)
Jason Eskridge – background vocals (2, 3, 6, 7, 9)

References

2016 albums
Amos Lee albums
Republic Records albums